Joyner may refer to:

Places
Joyner, Queensland, a suburb north of Brisbane, Australia 
Joyner, Tennessee, an unincorporated town in Morgan County, Tennessee, United States

People

Given name or nickname
Joyner Lucas, American rapper

Surname
A. Jack Joyner, American horse trainer
Al Joyner, American athlete
Arthenia Joyner, American politician
David Joyner (athletic director), American physician
David Joyner (actor), American actor
Edward Joyner, American basketball coach
Florence Griffith Joyner, American athlete, wife of Al
Jackie Joyner-Kersee, American athlete, sister of Al
Jackiem Joyner, American jazz musician
John Joyner, English rugby player
Jo Joyner, English actress
Joyzelle Joyner, American actress
Kitty Joyner, (1916–1993), American electrical engineer 
Lamarcus Joyner, American football player
Lionel Joyner (1932–2001), Canadian chess master
Lisa Joyner, American TV host
Marjorie Joyner, American inventor and businesswoman
Michael Joyner, American anesthesiologist and physiologist
Owen Joyner, American actor
Pamela Joyner (born 1957/58), American art collector
Rick Joyner (born 1949), founder of MorningStar Ministries
Sean Joyner, English cricket player
Seth Joyner, American football player
Tom Joyner, American TV and radio host
Wally Joyner, American baseball coach

Fictional people
Simon Joyner (City Homicide), fictional character from the Australian drama series City Homicide

See also
Joiner (disambiguation)